Bonnie and Clyde is a compilation album by Serge Gainsbourg and Brigitte Bardot. It was originally released by Fontana Records in 1968.

Critical reception

In 2013, Spin included it on the "Top 100 Alternative Albums of the 1960s" list.

Track listing

Personnel
Credits adapted from liner notes.

 Serge Gainsbourg – vocals (1, 3, 5, 6, 7, 9, 11, 12)
 Brigitte Bardot – vocals (1, 2, 4, 8, 10)
 Michel Colombier – orchestration (1)
 Alain Goraguer – orchestration (2, 4, 5, 6, 9, 11)
 David Whitaker – arrangement (3), direction (3)
 Harry Robinson – orchestration (7)
 Claude Bolling – orchestration (8, 10)
 Arthur Greenslade – direction (12)

Charts

References

External links
 
 

1968 albums
Serge Gainsbourg albums
Brigitte Bardot albums
Fontana Records albums
Vocal duet albums
French-language albums
Depictions of Bonnie and Clyde in music